The 2018 Tirreno–Adriatico NAMEDSPORT was a road cycling stage race that took place between 7 and 13 March 2018 in Italy. It was the 53rd edition of the Tirreno–Adriatico and the seventh event of the 2018 UCI World Tour.

A Polish rider won the race for the first time, as 's Michał Kwiatkowski took the overall victory; Kwiatkowski took the race lead after gaining bonus seconds on the fifth stage, and maintained the lead to the end of the race. Kwiatkowski finished 24 seconds clear of Damiano Caruso, while the podium was completed by another  rider, Geraint Thomas, a further 8 seconds behind Caruso. In the other classifications, Jacopo Mosca won the orange jersey as points classification winner, while Nicola Bagioli won the mountains classification and its accompanying green jersey.

Teams
As Tirreno–Adriatico was a UCI World Tour event, all eighteen UCI WorldTeams were invited automatically and obliged to enter a team in the race. Four UCI Professional Continental teams competed, completing the 22-team peloton.

Route
The route of the 2018 Tirreno–Adriatico was announced on 12 January 2018. As part of the route, a stage finish in Filottrano was scheduled in honour of Michele Scarponi, who died the previous April.

Stages

Stage 1
7 March 2018 — Lido di Camaiore to Lido di Camaiore, team time trial (TTT)

Stage 2
8 March 2018 – Camaiore to Follonica,

Stage 3
9 March 2018 – Follonica to Trevi,

Stage 4
10 March 2018 — Foligno to Sarnano–Sassotetto,

Stage 5
11 March 2018 — Castelraimondo to Filottrano,

Stage 6
12 March 2018 — Numana to Fano,

Stage 7
13 March 2018 — San Benedetto del Tronto to San Benedetto del Tronto, individual time trial (ITT)

Classification leadership table
In the 2018 Tirreno–Adriatico, four jerseys were awarded. The general classification was calculated by adding each cyclist's finishing times on each stage. Time bonuses were awarded to the first three finishers on all stages except for the time trials: the stage winner won a ten-second bonus, with six and four seconds for the second and third riders respectively. Bonus seconds were also awarded to the first three riders at intermediate sprints; three seconds for the winner of the sprint, two seconds for the rider in second and one second for the rider in third. The leader of the general classification received a blue jersey. This classification was considered the most important of the 2018 Tirreno–Adriatico, and the winner of the classification was considered the winner of the race.

The second classification was the points classification. Riders were awarded points for finishing in the top ten in a stage. Unlike in the points classification in the Tour de France, the winners of all stages – with the exception of the team time trial, which awarded no points towards the classification – were awarded the same number of points. Points were also won in intermediate sprints; five points for crossing the sprint line first, three points for second place, two for third and one for fourth. The leader of the points classification was awarded an orange jersey, a change from the red jersey awarded in 2017.

There was also a mountains classification, for which points were awarded for reaching the top of a climb before other riders. Each of the sixteen climbs was categorised as either Superior-, or single-category, with more points available for the more difficult, Superior-category climb to Sassotetto. For this climb, the top seven riders earned points; on the other climbs, only the top four riders earned points. The leadership of the mountains classification was marked by a green jersey.

The fourth jersey represented the young rider classification, marked by a white jersey. Only riders born after 1 January 1993 were eligible; the young rider best placed in the general classification was the leader of the young rider classification. There was also a classification for teams, in which the times of the best three cyclists in a team on each stage were added together; the leading team at the end of the race was the team with the lowest cumulative time.

References

Sources

External links
 

Tirreno-Adriatico
Tirreno-Adriatico
Tirreno-Adriatico
Tirreno–Adriatico